The following is a list of notable events and releases of the year 1894 in Norwegian music.

Events

 Pianist Erika Nissen (1845-1903) is granted an artist's scholarship by the Norwegian state.

Deaths

 June
 1 – Sophie Dedekam, composer and diarist (born 1820).

Births

 April
 13 – Ludvig Irgens-Jensen, twentieth-century composer (died 1969).

See also
 1894 in Norway
 Music of Norway

References

 
Norwegian music
Norwegian
Music
1890s in Norwegian music